The 1988 East Texas State Lions football team represented East Texas State University—now known as Texas A&M University–Commerce—as a member of the Lone Star Conference (LSC) during the 1988 NCAA Division II football season. Led by third-year head coach Eddie Vowell, the Lions compiled an overall record of 8–3 with a mark of 5–2 in conference play, trying for second place in the LSC. East Texas State began the season at 8–1 and reached as high as No. 2 in the NCAA Division II rankings before losing their final two games. It was Vowell's first winning season as head coach and the program's the first winning season since 1983. The team played its home games at Memorial Stadium in Commerce, Texas.

Schedule

Postseason awards

All-Americans
Kit Morton, First Team Defensive End
Gary Compton, Honorable Mention Receiver

All-Lone Star Conference

LSC First Team
Mike Ciszewski, Linebacker 
Gary Compton, Tight End/Receiver 
Kerry Shelton, Free Safety

LSC Second Team
Jeff Dotie, Receiver 
Kit Morton, Defensive End
Jarrod Owens, Running Back
Allen Roulette, Offensive Tackle
Steve Sellers, Offensive Lineman
Mike Trigg, Quarterback

LSC Honorable Mention
Gary DeVaughn, Defensive Line
Kevin Hedges, Offensive Tackle
Lee Hucklebridge, Defensive Line
Jeff Manuel, Safety
Aaron Muehlstein, Defensive Back
Ronnie Prater, Wide Receiver 
Shane Summers, Punter 
John Varnell, Center

References

East Texas State
Texas A&M–Commerce Lions football seasons
East Texas State Lions football